Krassó-Szörény (Hungarian: Krassó-Szörény, Romanian: Caraș-Severin, Serbian: Karaš-Severin or Караш-Северин) was an administrative county (comitatus) of the historic Kingdom of Hungary. Its territory is now mostly located in south-western Romania, with one very small part which is located in Serbia. The capital of the county was Lugos (present-day Lugoj).

Geography

Krassó-Szörény County was located in the Banat region. It shared borders with the Kingdom of Serbia and the Hungarian counties of Temes, Arad and Hunyad. The river Danube formed its southern border, and the river Mureș its northern border. The rivers Bega, Timiș, Bârzava, Caraș, Nera and Cerna flowed through the county. Its area was  around 1910.

History

Krassó-Szörény county was formed in 1881 by uniting the counties of Krassó (its center was Lugos/Lugoj) and Szörény (its center was Karánsebes/Caransebeș). Previously, Krassó County had been re-established in 1779, with significantly different borders than in medieval times, while Szörény County had only been established in 1873 (it was the shortest-lived county in the modern Kingdom of Hungary), mostly on the territory of the former Vlach Regiment of the Banat Military Frontier.

In 1920, by the Treaty of Trianon, most of the county was assigned to Romania, with one small part (villages of Banatska Subotica and Dobričevo) which was assigned to the Kingdom of Serbs, Croats and Slovenes. The rest now forms Caraș-Severin County, except for the city Orșova, which is in Mehedinți County.

Demographics

Subdivisions

In the early 20th century, the subdivisions of Krassó-Szörény county were:

Notes

References 

Counties in the Kingdom of Hungary
History of Banat
Vojvodina under Habsburg rule